Jocelyn Alexander Rowe (1886–unknown) was an English footballer who played as a right-back. He made one appearance in The Football League for Manchester United. He represented the Irish League XI.

Personal life 
Rowe served as a colour sergeant in the East Surrey Regiment during the First World War.

Career statistics

References

External links
MUFCInfo.com profile

English footballers
Manchester United F.C. players
Bohemian F.C. players
1886 births
Footballers from Kingston upon Thames
English Football League players
Kingstonian F.C. players
Irish League representative players
British Army personnel of World War I
East Surrey Regiment soldiers
Year of death missing
Association football fullbacks
NIFL Premiership players
Military personnel from Surrey